The women's 1500 metres at the 2022 European Athletics Championships will take place at the Olympiastadion on 16 and 19 August.

Records

Schedule

Results

Heats
First 4 in each heat (Q) and the next 4 fastest  (q) advance to the Final.

Final

References

1500 W
1500 metres at the European Athletics Championships
Euro